Jozef Čurgaly (4 December 1927 - 23 January 2014) was a former Slovak football player and manager.

He played for ŠK Slovan Bratislava and FC Nitra.

He coached ŠK Slovan Bratislava, FC Baník Ostrava and FC Nitra.

External links

 Profile at Czech football federation
 
 

1927 births
2014 deaths
Slovak footballers
Czechoslovak footballers
Association football forwards
Czechoslovakia international footballers
FC Nitra players
ŠK Slovan Bratislava players
Slovak football managers
Czechoslovak football managers
FC Baník Ostrava managers
FC Nitra managers
ŠK Slovan Bratislava managers